Nightshade Forests is the first EP by the Austrian black metal band Summoning. It consists of four songs left over from the Dol Guldur sessions in 1996. It was released on 3 June 1997, through Napalm Records.

Track listing

Credits 

 Protector – vocals, guitars, keyboards
 Silenius – vocals, keyboards

References

External links 

 Nightshade Forests at Encyclopaedia Metallum

Summoning (band) EPs
Black metal EPs
1997 EPs
Napalm Records EPs